Events from the year 1913 in Mexico.

Incumbents

Federal government
President: 
Francisco I. Madero (until February 19)
Pedro Lascuráin (c. 45 minutes on February 19)
Victoriano Huerta (starting February 19)
Vice-President: José María Pino Suárez
Secretary of the Interior: Rafael Hernández, Alberto García Granados, Aureliano Urrutia, Manuel Garza Aldape, Ignacio Alcocer

Governors
 Aguascalientes: 
 Campeche: Manuel Castilla Brito/Felipe Bueno/Manuel Rojas Moranos/Manuel Rivera
 Chiapas: Flavio Guillén/Marco Aurelio Solís/Reynaldo Gordillo León/Bernardo Palafox
 Chihuahua: Abraham González/Antonio Rábago/Salvador R. Mercado/Francisco Villa
 Coahuila: Ignacio Alcocer/Venustiano Carranza
 Colima: José Trinidad Alamillo/Vidal Fernández/Miguel M. Morales/Julián Jaramillo/Juan A. Hernández
 Durango:  
 Guanajuato: Fernando Dávila
 Hidalgo: 
 Jalisco: José M. Mier
 State of Mexico: José Refugio Velasco/Joaquín Beltrán Castañares
 Michoacán: 
 Morelos: Patricio Leyva Ochoa/Francisco Sánchez/Benito Tajonar/Juvencio Robles/Julián Arreola/Adolfo Jiménez Castro
 Nayarit: 
 Nuevo León: Antonio L. Villarreal/Salomé Botello
 Oaxaca: 
 Puebla: 
 Querétaro: Joaquín F. Chicarro
 San Luis Potosí: Rafael Cepeda
 Sinaloa: 
 Sonora: José María Maytorena
 Tabasco: 
 Tamaulipas: 
 Tlaxcala:  
 Veracruz: Antonio Pérez Rivera
 Yucatán: 
 Zacatecas:

Events
February 9–19 – Ten Tragic Days
March 23 – Battle of Nogales (1913)
April 8–13 – Battle of Naco
November 23–24 – Battle of Tierra Blanca

Births
February 5 — Oscar Flores Tapia, journalist, writer, and politician (PRI); Governor of Coahuila 1975–1981 (d. 1988)

Deaths
 February 9 – Bernardo Reyes, general and politician (b. 1850)
 February 18 – Gustavo A. Madero, Mexican Revolution participant (b. 1875)
 February 22
 Francisco I. Madero, 33rd President of Mexico (b. 1873)
 José María Pino Suárez, 7th Vice President of Mexico (b. 1869)
 March 7 – Abraham González, provisional and constitutional Governor of Chihuahua (b. 1864)
 October 7 – Belisario Domínguez, physician and liberal politician (b. 1863)

References

 
Years of the 20th century in Mexico
Mexico